Kandilli may refer to

Places
Kandilli, Istanbul, a neighborhood in Üsküdar district of Istanbul, Turkey
Kandilli, Zonguldak, a town in Zonguldak, Turkey known formerly as Armutçuk
Kandilli, Saimbeyli, a village in Saimbeyli district of Adana Province, Turkey
Kandilli, Bozüyük, a village in Bozüyük district of Bilecik Province, Turkey

Other uses
 Kandilli Anatolian High School for Girls, a high school in Kandilli, Istanbul, Turkey
 Kandilli Earthquake Museum, a science museum in Kandilli, Istanbul, Turkey
 Kandilli Observatory, an institution in Kandilli, Istanbul, Turkey dedicated mostly to earthquake science
 Kandilli Ski Resort, a winter sports venue in Erzurum, Turkey
 , a cargo ship operated by Mustafa Andi Nurak between 1950 and 1957